Böön Tsagaan Lake (Mongolian: Бөөн Цагаан нуур) is a large saline lake in Bayakhongor province in the Gobi Desert of southern Mongolia.  

Böön Tsagaan Lake and the nearby Taatsiin Tsagaan Lake, Adgiin Tsagaan Lake, and Orog Lake, are collectively designated a Ramsar wetland of international importance under the name "Valley of the Lakes".

See also
 Ramsar sites in Mongolia

References

Lakes of Mongolia
Gobi Desert
Endorheic lakes of Asia
Saline lakes of Asia
Bayankhongor Province
Ramsar sites in Mongolia